Jacques Dalma Landry (born 4 December 1969) is a retired professional Canadian cyclist.

Life 
Landry was born in Saskatoon, Saskatchewan.

He represented Canada in the 1992 Olympic Games and the 1996 Olympic Games in the individual road race, where he finished 62nd and 88th.

References

External links

1969 births
Living people
Canadian male cyclists
Cyclists at the 1992 Summer Olympics
Cyclists at the 1996 Summer Olympics
Fransaskois people
Olympic cyclists of Canada
Sportspeople from Saskatoon